Robin Howard Lovell-Badge, CBE, FRS FMedSci is a British scientist most famous for his discovery, along with Peter Goodfellow, of the SRY gene on the Y-chromosome that is the determinant of sex in mammals. They shared the 1995 Louis-Jeantet Prize for Medicine for their discovery. He was awarded the 2022 Genetics Society Medal.  He is currently a Senior Group Leader and Head of the Laboratory of Stem Cell Biology and Developmental Genetics at the Francis Crick Institute in Central London.

References

Living people
20th-century British biologists
21st-century British biologists
Commanders of the Order of the British Empire
Fellows of the Royal Society
Fellows of the Academy of Medical Sciences (United Kingdom)
Alumni of University College London
Year of birth missing (living people)
Academics of the Francis Crick Institute